SimsVille is a cancelled 2001 game by Maxis. It was meant to be a crossover game between The Sims (2000) and SimCity, which would offer the user control of a multitude of houses in a neighborhood, in a fashion similar to The Sims.

In March 2001, during a launch event in San Francisco, California for the release of The Sims: House Party expansion pack, several Maxis developers demonstrated SimsVille, and the game was due to be released in early 2002. It received a tepid response in comparison to the House Party demonstration. One significant difference between the gameplay of The Sims and SimsVille was that while in The Sims a player would push Sims by giving them commands to follow, in SimsVille a player could only pull Sims by placing objects with different degrees of attraction to the Sims; objects with insufficient attraction would be ignored by Sims. This new gameplay style did not allow as much player control in SimsVille as in The Sims, which contributed to its poor reception by those in attendance.

SimsVille was cancelled in September 2001, as Maxis decided to shift development efforts to expansion packs for The Sims instead. Many aspects of the game, such as a communal "downtown" area, were incorporated into The Sims: Hot Date expansion pack. Several gameplay elements of SimsVille, such as obtaining feedback from citizens, would be prominently used in Maxis' next city simulation game, SimCity 4 (2003). The ability to control many households at once and the fully 3D neighborhood view format was also used in The Sims 2 (2004). Finally, the concept of a fully open world without loading screens features in The Sims 3 (2009) and MySims (2007).

The trailer can be seen on the SimCity 3000 Unlimited and The Sims: Livin' Large installation CDs.

Gallery

References

External links 

Cancelled Windows games
Maxis Sim games
Electronic Arts games